Zachary Smith Reynolds (November 5, 1911 – July 6, 1932)
was an American amateur aviator and youngest son of American businessman and millionaire R. J. Reynolds. The son of one of the richest men in the United States at the time, Reynolds was to fully inherit $20 million dollars, valued at over $300 million today, when he turned twenty-eight, as established in his father's will.

In the early morning of July 6, 1932, Reynolds died under mysterious circumstances of a gunshot wound to the head, following a party on the family estate of the Reynolda House. A series of investigations revealed inconsistent testimony from the party-goers and signs of tampering with the crime scene. The death gained sensational national media coverage after Reynolds' wife of a few months, Broadway singer and actress Libby Holman, along with Reynolds' friend Albert "Ab" Walker, were indicted of first-degree murder charges by a grand jury. However, the case was eventually dropped, due to lack of evidence, and at the request of the Reynolds family. It remains unsolved. Based on the evidence and testimonies, it is unknown if it was a murder or suicide. Multiple films were inspired by the case, including the melodrama film Written on the Wind (1956).

Reynolds' siblings donated their shares of his estate  to form the Z. Smith Reynolds Foundation for the benefit of social causes in North Carolina.

Early life

Reynolds (also known as Z. Smith Reynolds, or just Smith) was the youngest child of R. J. Reynolds, founder of the R.J. Reynolds Tobacco Company, and Katharine Smith Reynolds. He was close to his three older siblings. His sister Nancy remembered him fondly in a 1980s interview: "Smith was my friend. I mean, he was younger than I, but you never felt that way about him because he was so intelligent, and he was so adult in his thinking... He was a very strong character, Smith was."

At the time of Smith's birth in 1911, R. J. Reynolds was the wealthiest man in the state of North Carolina, and the R.J. Reynolds Tobacco Company was producing one-fourth of all United States plug chewing tobacco. The introduction of the Camel cigarettes brand two years later in 1913 spiked the company's profits. In the first year of production, 425 billion Camel cigarettes were sold, becoming the most popular brand in the United States by 1918.

Reynolda Estate

The couple and their four children first lived in a Queen Anne-style Victorian mansion at 666 West Fifth street in Winston-Salem, North Carolina. The house was located on a street known as "Millionaire's Row," along with other wealthy Reynolds family members and important Reynolds Tobacco employees. While living at the mansion, Katharine began to design a country estate, the future Reynolda House. Agriculture and country living were very stylish among the American wealthy at the time; Katharine herself was subscribed to fashionable publications such as Town and Country, Women's Home Companion, and Country Life in America.

The 1,067 acre estate would be completed in winter of 1917. The centerpiece of the country home was a 64-room mansion, described modestly as a "bungalow" by R.J. and Katharine. The house was four stories and divided into a central section with two wings, each attached to the main house at a 20 degree angle. The design and construction of the house took a total of 5 years: the house's layout and utilities became complex to meet the needs of the family. The final plan included two kitchens, three dumbwaiters, an elevator, fourteen bathrooms, a telephone in each room, and an Aeolian Company pipe organ featuring four keyboards and a pedal footboard. The rugs, curtains, and other furnishings were designed and placed to absorb its harsh tones and create a warmer sound. The relatively simple exterior of the "bungalow" betrayed the luxurious interior: the main rooms - central living room, reception hall, and dining room - were decorated with detailed paneling, carved moldings, and rosettes, including Corinthian, Doric, and Ionic columns, and each public room had a carved-marble fireplace mantel.

The main house was complemented by formal gardens, vineyards, a golf course, two tennis courts, an outdoor swimming pool, and a man-made lake with a boathouse, called "Lake Katharine." Lake Katharine was created by damming the nearby Silas Creek. The lake's depth was regulated by a spillway that led into an artificial pool with a concrete bottom. Occasionally the pond would be emptied for cleaning by sweeping out the bottom and sides. Reynolda functioned as a self-sufficient estate and also featured the adjoining "Reynolda Village" for workers. It had its own post office, housing for employees, two churches, two schools, and a model farm to exhibit and innovate the latest practices in agriculture, livestock production, and horticulture. The building of the estate coincided with the growing wealth of the Reynolds family: the RJ Reynolds company experienced a sharp increase in profit after the introduction of the Camel cigarette brand. Net profits in 1912 were 2.9 million, and would jump to $23.8 million by 1924. In 1922, the Wall Street Journal reported that the company's net earnings were the highest ever taken in by a tobacco manufacturer in history.

1918-1924
The family permanently moved into Reynolda in December 1917. However, R.J. Reynolds had been experiencing illness due to pancreatic cancer earlier in the year. Treatments including quarantine and pulling all his teeth were unsuccessful. By early 1918, RJ was increasingly in pain and bedridden. He traveled between Winston-Salem and a Philadelphia hospital for treatments for his pancreatic cancer. After a major surgery, he was brought back to Reynolda and died July 29, 1918. R.J. had written a will beforehand that left each of his four children a trust that they had limited access to until they turned twenty-eight.

Since its opening, the three youngest children attended the school built for the estate. A year after RJ's death, Katharine soon began courting the headmaster who was hired in 1919, John Edward Johnston, a man about 20 years her junior. On June 11, 1921, Katharine and Ed Johnston married in the Reynolda house living room. After their honeymoon abroad in London and Paris, the couple moved to a smaller cabin on the estate, leaving the children in the main bungalow with their governess and other retainers. Against doctor's recommendations, at 44, Katharine became pregnant in early 1924. The pregnancy was difficult, and the couple moved into their New York City apartment to have better access to doctors. On May 21, she gave birth to J. Edward Johnston Jr.; however, three days later, she died from complications of the birth when a blood clot traveled to her brain and triggered an embolism.

After Katharine's death, the responsibility of the children's care fell to Johnston and their uncle William Neal Reynolds. That summer, they sent the children on a  summer tour of Europe and South America, being something which had already been previously planned by Katharine.

Education
Reynolds spent two years at Woodberry dabbling in various clubs, including the Smokers Club, where he was known as "Camel" Reynolds. While at Woodberry, he wrote at least two suicide notes: the notes would be taken out from his papers after his death and shown during the inquest. One note was written as a last will and reads: "LAST WILL. I will my car to Ab [Walker, his best friend], if he finishes it. My money to Dick. My reputation to Virginia. My good looks to Mary (she needs it.) P.S. You think I am tite [drunk], but I'm not. P.S. Hope you don't feel hurt about this will." The second was written in a scribble on the back of a statement from Finchley, Clothes & Haberdashery, dated June 1927: "My girl has turned me down. Good-bye forever. Give my love to Mary, Virginia, Nancy, Dick, etc. Good-bye cruel world — Smith."

His brother Dick dropped out of North Carolina State College of Agriculture and Engineering after two semesters to move to New York. By this time Smith Reynolds had switched schools to R.J. Reynolds High School; following lack of success, he followed his brother's lead, dropping out at fifteen to join him and work for the newly founded Reynolds Aviation.

Aviation
Reynolds was an avid sports aviator like his older brother. After the success of Charles Lindbergh's historic transatlantic flight in 1927, Dick Reynolds took on aviation as a business venture, buying the historic Roosevelt Field, along with the nearby Curtiss and Mitchell fields, and founded airlines Reynolds Aviation and Camel City Flying Service. Unofficial family historian W. Noah Reynolds felt that Smith's interest in aviation came from his brother Dick, as "Smith looked up to his older brother and wanted to do what his older brother did." Nancy Reynolds thought both her brothers "had mechanical, mathematical type of minds." In summer 1926, Smith Reynolds took his first flying lessons from Lewis S. "Mac" McGinnis, a flying instructor for Curtiss Flying School. The brothers would practice takeoffs and landings on the  front lawn of the Reynolda bungalow, and perform tricks in the air to terrify their sisters Mary and Nancy.

Smith Reynolds eventually dropped out of school to work for Reynolds Aviation and grow as an independent aviator. A classmate at R.J. Reynolds High School, Egbert Davis Jr., remembered that Reynolds was not interested when Davis invited him to join the local Hi-Y YMCA club: "Smith wanted to spend all his spare time flying."  Attesting to his passion, his 1928 financial records show expenses for a new Waco 10 Whirlwind plane, pilot's insurance, aviation club memberships, aviation magazines, parachutes, etc. Nancy Reynolds recalled that Reynolds and his sister Mary would regularly "[get] a lot of practice barnstorming...They'd go around and have these shows in some farmer's field that he'd mowed up for them." In addition, he participated in the local Winston-Salem aviation community: in September 1928, he won an amateur race at the dedication of Winston-Salem's new airport, Miller Field.

Reynolds earned a private pilot's license at 16 on August 1, 1928, attested to by the Fédération Aéronautique Internationale and personally signed by Orville Wright. In May 1929, he obtained his transport pilot's license and Airframe and Engine mechanic's license; at seventeen, he was the youngest person in the country to hold a transport pilot's license. By then, Reynolds was a sort of local hero within Winston-Salem, and one of the state's most notable sports aviators during the "Golden Age" of aviation.

1931 journey
Reynolds' biggest achievement in aviation was the longest point-to-point solo circumnavigation at the time, at 17,000 miles over land, lasting from December 1931 to April 1932. The journey began in London and ended in Hong Kong; in between, flying over territories including the Mediterranean, North Africa, the Syrian Desert, and India. Reynolds began preparing for the trip in spring of 1931, buying a Savoia-Marchetti S.56 biplane, built by American Aeronautical Corporation in Port Washington, New York. The aircraft was specially customized to have a single seat and extra fuel capacity for 1,000 miles cruising range. After purchasing the plane, Reynolds met with a childhood friend, Robert "Slick" Shepherd, a reporter for the Winston-Salem Journal. Reynolds and Shepherd created a business arrangement in which Shepard would ghost write the story of the flight around the world and syndicate it through a national press agency. Reynolds requested it to be made to sound exciting and unforgettable, in the spirit of other famous aviation exploits of the day. In return, Shepherd would receive half of the selling price for the story. The journey was delayed by several false starts due to negotiations for flying permits, multiple bouts of illness, and mechanical troubles. Reynolds kept a handwritten flight log, "Log of Aeroplane NR-898W," documenting his impressions and flight data during the journey, to be referenced for future publication by Shepherd. The log reveals the challenging and often dangerous nature of the trip. The plane went through near constant mechanical problems, leading to numerous forced landings. Reynolds had to fix his own equipment, usually completely alone and in a remote area; he records becoming nearly stranded multiple times. Flying over poorly charted land, he often navigated only by following railroads, rivers, coastlines, or landmarks seen on a road map, as seen in an example from the log: 

The flight was not recorded in popular aviation history. Reynolds was unable to complete the last 270 miles of the route by plane: When flying between Haiphong to Chanchiang, China, the plane almost ditched. Reynolds was forced to lighten the load by throwing supplies overboard in order to take off again. Landing in Chanchiang revealed engine damage that would prevent the plane from operating without extensive repairs; as such, Reynolds made it to Hong Kong by catching a ride on an oil ship. He then cancelled the planned publication of the journey, abandoning the flight log and rescinding the previous offer to Slick Shepherd. Upon returning to the United States, Reynolds settled with his new wife at Reynolda for the remaining summer. He enrolled in New York University's aeronautical engineering program for the fall of 1932, and hired on a NYU graduate student to tutor him in mathematics in the meantime. Reynolds would die before ever entering into the program.

After Reynolds' death, his sister Nancy Susan Reynolds had the flight log privately published to honor his memory. The 31 original copies were distributed among family and friends. The pages of the original log have been scanned and digitized for the Southwest Virginia Digital Archive of Virginia Tech. Reprinted copies of the log are sold at the Reynolda House museum gift shop.

The NR 898 aircraft used in the flight was eventually shipped from Hong Kong to Seattle, Washington. It was sold by Reynolds' estate on August 4, 1933; six years later it was destroyed during a hangar fire while being stored in Salem, Oregon. A Savoia-Marchetti S.56C aircraft, like the one used by Reynolda in 1931, is on display at the Carolinas Aviation Museum in Charlotte, North Carolina. The aircraft is on long-term loan from the Reynolda House in Winston-Salem.

Personal life
In summer 1929, Reynolds began courting Anne Ludlow Cannon of Concord, North Carolina, granddaughter of James William Cannon and an heiress of the Cannon Mills textile fortune. He would fly to Concord in order to take her on rides in his plane. Anne's father Joe F. Cannon insisted that the couple be married. In the early morning of November 16, 1929, he had the teenagers and himself chauffeured to York, South Carolina, arriving around 2:00 AM, to be married in a shotgun wedding. The marriage quickly deteriorated; at the annual society Christmas party in the Winston-Salem Robert E. Lee hotel, Reynolds and Cannon got into a fight. After the party, the pair returned to their apartments at the downtown Carolina Hotel to host a dinner, still incensed. In front of Reynolds' friends, the fight escalated to dramatic proportions. Reynolds slapped Cannon twice to quieten her and sent her to bed. Afterwards, he sat at an open window and sullenly threw dinner plates out to the streetcar tracks nine stories down. In a 1980 interview for the Reynolda House Oral History Project, Reynolds' sister Nancy Susan would recall: "I know he had a very bad temper. Really, when he got angry, he was really angry."

By early 1930, despite Anne being pregnant, the pair had effectively separated. In August 1930, Anne Cannon gave birth to a daughter, Anne Cannon Forsyth, who was sent to live with her grandparents in Blowing Rock, North Carolina.

On January 6, 1930, Reynolds' sister Nancy married Henry Walker Bagley at Reynolda. Charles Brackett was one of the groomsmen; after Reynolds' death, he wrote in his diary on July 6, 1932: "The Reynolds children seemed to me perfect examples of what too much money and too little discipline can produce. The brothers hopped into the bedrooms of the guests to drop eggs on their heads or frighten them with shotguns...the night of the wedding they celebrated by throwing heavy benches from a balcony to the floor of the hall."

About a month into the marriage with Anne, Reynolds' friend Dwight Deere Wiman, heir to the John Deere tractor fortune, came to Winston-Salem to visit. Wiman was the producer of the current Broadway hit, The Little Show. In April 1930, Reynolds went to see Wiman's touring company of The Little Show in Baltimore. He was dazzled by Broadway star Libby Holman and her performance, including her signature song Moanin' Low. After being introduced, Reynolds followed up with flowers and notes. Holman would spend the 1929 summer in Florida with her friends; he followed her down in his plane, becoming part of her entourage. Holman would later claim that "Smith asked me to marry him that first summer, almost right after he had met me...I said no, I didn't think I should marry him because he was so young. And, of course, he hadn't his divorce yet and was still married. I told him I thought he had better wait a while. Besides, I was in the theater and didn't think it was fair to marry while still in the theater. He first agreed to that, to wait five years. Then he came to see me and said, 'You go on in the theater, Libby. I need you now. I never had any love in my life and I want someone like you, and as soon as I get my divorce I want you to marry me. I have been alone all my life.'" Libby's friends disliked Smith's brooding attitude but tolerated him as he paid for visits to nightclubs, speakeasies, and mixings with the elite of New York society. His constant presence led to Clifton Webb calling him Libby's personal mascot: "Smitty, the traveling bear."

Libby Holman
Libby Holman had a variety of relationships with both men and women during her lifetime, most prominently with DuPont heiress Louisa d'Andelot Carpenter. Although friendly and affectionate to Reynolds, eight years to junior, friends felt she treated him like an "amiable buffoon." A contemporary remembered of her: "She had a rather unique beauty that was quite apart from what the fashionable magazines might say was currently beautiful. Her eyes and her hair, which she tended to wear in strange and wild fashions compared to the rest of us, were most striking. And she seemed to be able to eat and drink all she wanted to without worrying about her figure. We all felt frightfully sorry for young Smith when she annexed him. She seemed capable of eating him up totally. She was certainly a tough gal. I was often at odds with some of my friends who liked her quite a bit, even though they were terribly jealous of her. I never wanted to see any more of her than I could help. But she was in great demand. And if you wanted to go to the parties, you were sure to run into her."

Smith continued to follow Libby in his plane, behaving increasingly erratically: in summer of 1930, he rented a cottage nearby Louisa Carpenter's house, with whom Libby was staying. When the pair sailed to Europe, he had private detectives find where they were staying in Paris, and appeared on their doorstep. After following her back to the US, they quarreled often as he repeatedly implored her to quit her career to marry him. They would descend into fights in front of Libby's friends at the Harlem speakeasies they liked to frequent. After one catastrophic row, he flew west and passed the remaining summer in California and Colorado, though still continued to call Libby regularly on the telephone. Once, he landed in Denver, checked into the Brown Palace Hotel, and called Libby's apartment drunk. Over the call, he told Libby that if she didn't promise to marry him, he would kill himself. Libby managed to talk him down and get him to hang up and sleep on it. Furious, she then took a taxi to Clifton Webbs' house to rant, telling his mother Maybelle that she'd "put herself on the spot for that damn fool kid."

Libby Holman went on to star in the smash-hit Broadway revue Three's a Crowd. Describing her career at this point, a journalist said: "Her name was the toast of Broadway. In The Little Show she had been a hit. In this new venture, a million hits in one." Reynolds joined her in New York as the show cycled through over 200 performances; he saw almost every performance, sitting in the front row. Although they began dating and were identified as a couple, they continued to quarrel often; Reynolds would also continue to make threats of suicide to her.

In June 1931, Smith rented a home nearby Libby's residence in Sands Point, Long Island. Neighbors of her cottage were scandalized at the behavior of Libby and her entourage. They often threw raucous parties and went about mostly nude. While they continued to see each other, tension arose as Libby continued her longtime relationship with Louisa d'Andelot Carpenter. The pair, along with Libby's sister Marion, Tallulah Bankhead, and her sister Eugenie Bankhead, left Reynolds behind and sailed the Long Island sound for a week on Louisa's father's yacht. After their return Reynolds and Libby were able to spend time together, but continuously fought, leading to erratic results. Once, he allegedly came across Libby and Louisa together on the couch at her cottage, and immediately turned on his heel and slammed the door. He sped off in his Rolls-Royce roadster towards the ocean, driving it off a four-foot retaining wall before crashing it into the waves. In another alleged incident, a loud shot rang out from Libby's cottage, followed by arguing shouts. A group of neighbors crept up to the window to peer in after everything quieted down: instead of a chaotic scene, they only witnessed Libby reading a book, and Smith Reynolds with his head in her lap.

Flight instructor Peter Bonelli later remembered an episode in which Reynolds expressed suicidal inclination. Libby, but not Smith, had been invited to a party hosted by Beatrice Lillie; upon learning he was being excluded, Reynolds  hurried to the nearby airfield. Bonelli found him readying his plane for takeoff in tears: ""I thought he had had another fight with Libby - he was always upset after these - and tried to kid him out of his mood...He told me that Beatrice Lillie was trying to break up his affair with Libby, that she was throwing a party for Libby but failed to invite him, although she knew that he was staying at Libby's cottage." Then, "He hopped off without giving his motors more than a minute's warming up. He zoomed up off the ground crazily. I thought he was going to crash. His plane wobbled but he held her nose up, then, straight as a crow flies, he headed out into the ocean...He was gone for seven hours and when he returned he admitted that he had intended flying straight out until, gas exhausted, he would fall into the ocean. The least little mechanical trouble would have finished him."

On the opposite side of the spectrum, Reynolds also showered Libby with affection: once, he flew a low-flying plane over the Sands Point house, dropping rose petals by hand along the cottage's private walk to the beach.

During the investigation into Reynolds' death in 1932, Libby would claim that Reynolds was deathly afraid of being kidnapped for his money. She described incidents she witnessed of his paranoia, such as leaving a dummy on top of his bed, while he himself slept under it; lurking around the house with a pistol if he heard a strange noise; accidentally firing said pistol inside the cottage on one occasion; and, once, upon hearing people talking outside the house, jumping out the back window and running two miles for the police. However, biographers Patrick Reynolds and Tom Shachtman doubt the veracity of these statements. Police reports describing any of these incidents were never filed; furthermore, Libby claimed he was petrified of kidnappers before the time that the Lindbergh kidnapping had gripped the national public consciousness.

Divorce and remarriage
On August 26, Reynolds had his Savoia-Marchetti plane hauled aboard the Cunard liner  and sailed to Southampton, then flying to London, to begin his 1931 round-the-world flight. However, he contracted the flu while staying in a London hotel. Newspapers quoted despondent letters said to have been sent to Libby while feeling horribly ill: "I have been sick. I don't know what's the matter, but I never felt more like dying in a long time." Libby wrote back recommending he return home. He responded in September, cabling her: "Why return now? Meet you later — but suicide is preferable. This is the last cable. Love, Smith." The same day, she also received a previously-sent letter: "Darling Angel. I would gladly come home if you were not going on with the show. I'll gladly give up this trip or anything I have to devote all my time to you, if you would do the same for me. If I get to the point where I simply cannot stand it without you for another minute, well, there's the old Mauser with a few cartridges in it. I guess I've had my inning. It's time another team went to bat." In their book The Gilded Leaf, biographers Patrick Reynolds and Shachtman speculate that Reynolds' repeated references to suicide were a form of emotional manipulation to obtain affection from Holman.

Complications from the flu soon developed into a mastoid infection, forcing him to return to the United States for treatment. After a successful surgery, he took the opportunity to spend a weekend in Winston-Salem at Reynolda to recuperate. He invited and took Libby, who was on tour for Three's a Crowd, along with him. Upon arriving, he took her up in a plane and circled the estate from above, thoroughly impressing her. Reynolds held a party for her that night with his Winston-Salem friends at Reynolda.  She sang "Moanin' Low," "Body and Soul", and other of her signature torch songs.

After she returned north to continue the Three's a Crowd tour, Reynolds flew Anne Cannon out to Reno, Nevada, known informally as the "Divorce Capital of the World." In 1927, the required residency for citizenship — and then a divorce — was only six months; in 1931, it was further reduced to only six weeks. A variety of "divorce ranches" were created to cater to the wealthy coming to seek "quickie" divorces. Anne Cannon stayed at the "Lazy Me" ranch owned by Cornelius Vanderbilt Jr. to put in her residency. In the deposition of the divorce, Cannon reported that Reynolds would curse at her and made her feel "terribly nervous and upset." Reynolds testified that they separated because of social differences: "She likes big parties and I like small parties." The divorce was finalized November 23, 1931. The terms of the separation included that Cannon would receive $500,000 of the trust he would come into, with their infant daughter Anne Reynolds receiving the same amount. In his 1932 diary, after Reynolds' death, Charles Brackett wrote: "... Smith Reynolds, when he came to New York, evidently felt a Theda Bara lure in her [Libby] and they were married. I am sorry to report that Howard Dietz [Libby's friend] tells me that early in the acquaintance Libby said, "'If the Cannon girl got a million out of this, why shouldn't I get five million?'"

Six days later, on November 29, 1931, Smith Reynolds married Libby Holman in the parlor of Monroe, Michigan's Justice of the Peace. There was no time for a honeymoon: the new Libby Reynolds left to go back on tour, and Smith Reynolds took his 17,000 mile journey. They both agreed to meet in Hong Kong for an official honeymoon. After the trip was over, the couple returned to the United States and settled for the summer at Reynolda.

Death
Reynolds died under mysterious circumstances from a shot to his head from a semi-automatic Mauser .32 caliber pistol on the early morning of July 6, 1932, after a 21st birthday party for his friend Charles Gideon Hill, Jr. (July 5, 1911 - October 18, 1960), Reynolds' childhood friend and Anne Cannon's first cousin.

Reynolds was shot and fell unconscious on the East sleeping porch of the Reynolda House. After the party guests had left, the only people in the house aside from Reynolds and Holman were Albert "Ab" Bailey Walker, Reynolds' boyhood friend and personal assistant, and actress Blanche Yurka, friend of Libby. Walker reported during the inquest to Reynolds' death that he heard a gunshot while downstairs, and immediately afterwards Holman had run to the balcony and shouted, "Smith's killed himself!". Walker said he found Reynolds bleeding and unconscious upstairs, with a bullet wound in his right temple. With Holman and Yurka's help, Walker brought Reynolds to North Carolina Baptist Hospital.

Aftermath
Reynolds was pronounced dead at 5:25 a.m. On the same day, the Forsyth County coroner recorded and announced the death as a suicide. However, a coroner's inquiry subsequently proclaimed that the death was the result of a bullet fired by 'a person or persons unknown.' The terminology was tailored to legally exclude Reynolds as the firer of the gun, ruling out suicide and suggesting murder instead. Both Walker and Holman were considered suspects in his death and were eventually both indicted, in order to investigate further through an official trial, for first-degree murder of Reynolds — Holman for the suspected murder itself and Walker as an accomplice. The case attracted national attention. Reporters printed dramatic allegations that Holman had conducted an affair with Walker, and that the two deliberately murdered Reynolds. Reynolds' uncle William Neal Reynolds told the district attorney that the family believed Reynolds’ death was a suicide and that they supported dropping the charges; the prosecutor eventually did so for lack of evidence, and no trial was ever held.

The trauma of Reynolds' death would follow Holman until the end of her life. She died by suicide June 18, 1971. Friend and former lover Ned Rorem recorded in his diary on June 22:

That Holman was unable to remember what happened is repeated by biographer Jon Bradshaw's work. Bradshaw relates from interviews with still-living close friends that Holman called them on the telephone in a panic: "She told Louisa [Carpenter] that the Reynolds family were being horrible to her, almost as though they suspected that she had something to do with Smith's demise. But unfortunately Libby could not remember anything. 'I was so drunk last night,' she said, 'I don't know whether I shot him or not.'"

Zachary Smith Reynolds is buried in the Salem Cemetery in Winston-Salem.

Legacy

Philanthropy
Reynolds' siblings underwent a prolonged fight to receive their share of Reynolds' estate, after which in 1936 they established a trust in his name that provided for his namesake foundation, the Z. Smith Reynolds Foundation. The foundation's first grant in 1937 went towards the North Carolina State Health Department's activities to treat venereal disease in North Carolinians, with $1.5 million being contributed over the course of the 10-year grant. The Foundation's financial gifts were instrumental in moving all of Wake Forest University from Wake Forest, North Carolina to Winston-Salem in 1956. Additional activities include the creation of the Mary Reynolds Babcock Professorship at Davidson College; Katharine Smith Reynolds Scholarships at University of North Carolina at Greensboro; and scholarships for the Stouffer Foundation.

In addition, the local airport, Smith Reynolds Airport, and the main library at Wake Forest University, the "Z. Smith Reynolds Library" (informally referred to as "ZSR" library) are named in his honor. Formally known as Miller Municipal Airport, in 1942 the airport was renamed to Smith Reynolds after the Z. Smith Reynolds Foundation gave funds for its expansion and modernization, allowing it to increase commercial service.

Children

Anne Reynolds Forsyth
Reynolds's daughter Anne Reynolds was raised primarily by her grandmother, Annie Ludlow Cannon, who worked to keep her granddaughter shielded from the press. While growing up she lived primarily between the Cannon residence in Concord and their summer home in Blowing Rock known as "Miramichi," meaning "happy retreat." After the highly publicized legal proceedings resulting in her gaining a portion of her father's inheritance, she was referred in the press as possibly "the richest baby in the world." In the post-Lindbergh kidnapping years, wealthy families feared ransoms and kidnapping threats. During Reynolds's childhood her grandparents received a death threat saying "you're next" in reference to their granddaughter. They then hired full-time Pinkerton agents who lived in a detached bedroom on the lower floor of Miramichi, accompanying Reynolds outside the house even on play-dates with other children. Although rarely appearing in society, Reynolds was an ardent horsewoman and did participate in the annual Blowing Rock Horse Show. In 1948, at the age of eighteen, she married Lloyd "Junebug" Tate, a childhood friend and prominent horseman in the southern East coast horse show circles.

Tate inherited her portion of Z. Smith Reynolds's estate, valued at $9 million, when she turned twenty-one in 1951. Her first action the same day was to donate $30,000 towards the efforts to establish the Blowing Rock Hospital, a significant donation in a rural area without access to quality healthcare. This began her career as a prominent southern philanthropist. Her future endeavors would focus primarily in fighting poverty and segregation in education. She was a founder and later president for the North Carolina Fund, and experimental program inspired by Governor Terry Sanford's "war on poverty" in the state. In 1967 she founded the Anne C. Stouffer Foundation (named after her mother who died in 1961). The Foundation gave full-ride scholarships to black students to attend and integrate elite southern boarding schools. In creating the foundation, she felt "if we could pick out really smart kids and show these [white] boys that they [blacks] aren't just basketball players or football players or musicians, but that they are bright, with good attributes and willingness to learn... we could stop them [whites] from being bigots and help them view black people as they are — fellow human beings," though she admitted that "in the end [the program] would be far more enriching for the whites than the blacks," a sentiment echoed by former Stouffer Scholar Anthony Chase who felt that "the black students at the various schools [where Stouffer scholars attended] were there to satisfy a need white students had. In other words, it wasn't for us, we were there for them." In 1969, Forsyth and her second husband, Dr. Harry "Frank" Forsyth, contributed to the tuition for four students out of pocket; these students were the only black women to live at Wake Forest's campus at the time. In addition to high-profile activity in major philanthropist organizations, she also contributed anonymously to many causes. After her death in 2003, her friend Vernon Jordan recalled of her: "She was a dear and precious friend to me. I remember her for her unselfish, caring generosity. We both were interested in the South, making the South better, and making it better for blacks. She shared and she cared, and she dared, and she did." Like other Reynolds family members, she was also active working with the Z. Smith Reynolds Foundation.

Christopher Smith "Topper" Reynolds
Reynolds's second child was born after his death in January 1933 at Pennsylvania Hospital. The child was premature, only weighing , and required care in an infant incubator directly after birth. In her first interview after the July shooting, Holman had stated she would name the child 'Smith' regardless of sex: "Boy or girl, that's to be the name." However, 'Smith' was relegated to his middle name, with Christopher as first. He would later gain the lifelong nickname of "Topper."

In August 1950, 17-year old Reynolds and his friend Stephen Wasserman spent the summer in California to work at the Cerro Gordo Mines, owned by Wasserman's father. At some point they made a plan to climb the East face of Mount Whitney, a feat only accomplished twice before by two-man teams. The two youths began their ascent on August 6; they were reported as missing on August 11. Wasserman's body was found by a rescue team August 13 at the base of a 3,000-foot sheer cliff. An advanced climbing team found Reynolds's body days later, wedged in a crevice on the cliff face. Rescuers speculated they were within 300 feet of the summit before falling; roped together, one slipping seemed to have taken the other down with them. 10 ft of snapped nylon rope was found tied to Wasserman's body, with the remaining 80 on Reynolds. After Christopher's death, the devastated Holman established the Christopher Reynolds Foundation in 1952. The foundation famously provided a significant grant supporting Martin Luther King Jr's 1959 trip to India to study the nonviolent tactics of Mahatma Gandhi

Film and media
Multiple films have been inspired by the events of Reynolds' life. Two were made only three years after the scandal occurred: Sing, Sinner, Sing (1933) and Reckless (1935). Sing, Sinner, Sing, starring Paul Lukas and Leila Hyams, is the only directing credit for producer Howard Christie. Hyams plays a singer married to a wealthy playboy, who is accused of his murder on a gambling ship when all evidence points towards her. The character meant to represent Reynolds, played by Don Dillaway, is perpetually drunk throughout the film. Notable Jazz musicians Lionel Hampton and Marshal Royal can be seen in multiple scenes as part of the Les Hite Orchestra.

In Reckless, Jean Harlow plays a torch singer who becomes involved with an overzealous fan, a wealthy millionaire (Franchot Tone). Joan Crawford was originally cast as the lead role, but was replaced by Harlow a week before shooting, as producer David O. Selznick wanted to capitalize off of Harlow's romance with co-star William Powell at the time, and her own relationship to a similar scandal, the mysterious death of her former husband Paul Bern.

See also
List of unsolved deaths

References

Notes

Bibliography
 Brackett, Charles. "It's the Pictures That Got Small": Charles Brackett on Billy Wilder and Hollywood's Golden Age. Columbia University Press, December 16, 2014. 
 Bradshaw, Jon. Dreams That Money Can Buy: The Tragic Life of Libby Holman. William Morrow & Co, March 1, 1985.  
 Faderman, Lillian. Odd Girls and Twilight Lovers: A History of Lesbian Life in Twentieth-century America. Columbia University Press, 1991. 
 Gillespie, Michele. Katharine and R. J. Reynolds: Partners of Fortune in the Making of the New South. University of Georgia Press, October 1, 2012. 
 Reynolds, Zachary Smith. Log of Aeroplane NR-898W. Reynolda House Museum of American Art, 2003. [Republished version. Introduction and notes by Barbara Babcock Millhouse.] 
 Mayer, Barbara. Reynolda: A History of an American Country House. Blair, April 1, 1997. 
 Machlin, Milt. Libby. Tower & Leisure Sales Co, July 1, 1980. 
 Perry, Hamilton Darby. Libby Holman: Body and Soul. Little Brown & Co, October 1, 1983. 
 Reynolds, Patrick. The Gilded Leaf: Triumph, Tragedy, and Tobacco: Three Generations of the R. J. Reynolds Family and Fortune. Little Brown & Co. 
 Tilley, Nannie M. The R.J. Reynolds Tobacco Company. Chapel Hill : University of North Carolina Press.  
 Tursi, Frank (1994). Winston-Salem: A History. J.F. Blair, 1994.

Further reading
 Bechtel, Stefan. Anatomy of an inquest : it never came to trial, but the puzzling death of Z. Smith Reynolds, teenage aviator and tobacco heir, has never been fully explained, Greensboro. Vol. 3, no. 5 (holiday 1978), UNC Chapel Hill Libraries Collection 
 Gilbert, Sky. Play murder, Blizzard Pub Ltd,

External links
Winston-Salem Journal Series Death at Reynolda - Z. Smith Reynolds
The Z Smith Reynolds Foundation
Z. Smith Reynolds Airport
Biography of Libby Holman Reynolds on the official Jane Bowles site
Reynolds Homestead

1911 births
1932 deaths
1932 in North Carolina
American aviators
Deaths by firearm in North Carolina
People from Winston-Salem, North Carolina
Zachary
Unsolved deaths in the United States
Burials at Salem Cemetery